Stareater may refer to:

Stareater, a fish from the Antarctic Ocean
Stareater, a mollusc-like creature from the game Insaniquarium